Dilara Kazimova (born 20 May 1984) is an Azerbaijani singer and actress. She represented Azerbaijan in the Eurovision Song Contest 2014 in Copenhagen with the song "Start a Fire".

Career
Born in Baku, Kazimova studied vocal arts at the Baku Academy of Music. After graduating, she briefly performed as part of an opera troupe. From the early 2000s, she was a member of the rock band Unformal and later the lead singer for the duo Milk & Kisses. Both bands participated in the Azerbaijani national selection for the Eurovision Song Contest before, with Unformal placing second in the national final in 2008, and Milk & Kisses placing second again in the national final in 2010. In 2010, the duo Milk & Kisses represented Azerbaijan at the annual New Wave music festival in Jurmala, Latvia, but came 16th out of 17 contestants.

In 2014, Kazimova participated in the Azerbaijani selection (this time by herself) and won the competition. "Start a Fire", the song with which Dilara represented Azerbaijan in Copenhagen, was released two weeks later, on 16 March 2014, at the same time as the video clip. Dilara performed in the first semi-final of the contest, placing 9th with 57 points and ultimately qualified to the final. In the final she came 22nd with 33 points.

Also in 2014, Kazimova was a contestant on the fourth season the Ukrainian reality talent show Holos Krayiny (part of the international syndication The Voice), under the coaching of Svyatoslav Vakarchuk.

Kazimova has also starred in two Azerbaijani films Try Not to Breathe (alongside Fakhraddin Manafov) in 2006 and Purgatory (for which she recorded the soundtrack "Sonsuz yol" as part of the band Unformal) in 2007.

In May 2022, Kazimova performed at the EuroVillage festival in Baku, whose goal is to promote cooperation between the EU and Azerbaijan.

Discography

Singles

Filmography

References

21st-century Azerbaijani women singers
Eurovision Song Contest entrants for Azerbaijan
Eurovision Song Contest entrants of 2014
Musicians from Baku
Living people
Baku Academy of Music alumni
English-language singers from Azerbaijan
Azerbaijani film actresses
21st-century Azerbaijani actresses
1984 births
The Voice (franchise) contestants
The Voice of Ukraine contestants
Azerbaijani rock musicians
Articles containing video clips